Thomas Barlow may refer to:

Politicians
 Thomas Barlow (merchant) (1788–1844), New Brunswick merchant, banker and politician
 Thomas Barlow (New York politician) (1805–1896), New York lawyer and politician
 Thomas Barlow (Kentucky politician) (1940–2017), U.S. Congressman from Kentucky

Sportspeople
 Thomas Barlow (basketball) (1896–1983), American basketball player
 Tom Barlow (baseball) (1852–?), American baseball player
 Tom Barlow (rugby union) (1864–1942), Welsh international rugby player and cricketer
 Tom Barlow (English footballer) (1875–?), British football player
 Tom Barlow (American soccer) (born 1995), American soccer player

Others
 Thomas Barlow (bishop) (1607–1691), British librarian and bishop
 Sir Thomas Barlow, 1st Baronet (1845–1945), British physician
 Sir Thomas Barlow, 3rd Baronet (1914–2003), British naval commander, grandson of the above
 Thomas Barlow (British businessman) (1883–1964), British businessman
 Thomas Oldham Barlow (1824–1889), British printmaker
 Thomas Worthington Barlow (1823–1856), British antiquary
 Tom Barlow (musician) (born  1965), Canadian singer
 T. B. Walker (Thomas Barlow Walker, 1840–1928), American timber tycoon and art collector